Ingegärd Anita Hellström (later Stockwell, also Meredith, born 13 June 1940) is a retired Swedish freestyle swimmer. She competed at the 1956 Summer Olympics in the 100 m, 400 m and  events and finished sixth in the relay.

References

1940 births
Living people
Olympic swimmers of Sweden
Swimmers at the 1956 Summer Olympics
Swedish female freestyle swimmers
SK Neptun swimmers
20th-century Swedish women